"Lying Down" is a song recorded by Canadian singer Celine Dion for her twelfth English-language studio album, Courage (2019). It was written by David Guetta, Giorgio Tuinfort and Sia, and produced by Guetta and Tuinfort. "Lying Down" was released as a digital download on 18 September 2019. On the same day, Dion embarked on her Courage World Tour and performed the song during the first fifteen dates before replacing it with "Imperfections". "Lying Down" entered several charts, and received positive reviews from music critics. On 19 October 2019, it was sent to radio in the United Kingdom.

Background and release
"Lying Down" was written by Australian singer-songwriter Sia, French DJ-producer David Guetta, and a Surinamese-Dutch musician Giorgio Tuinfort, and produced by Guetta and Tuinfort. Together with the songs "Imperfections" and "Courage", it was released as a digital download on 18 September 2019, the day Dion started her Courage World Tour, promoting Courage. "Lying Down" is a string-laden electro ballad, which encourages a fresh mindset following a toxic relationship. Previously, Sia co-wrote for Dion her 2013 single, "Loved Me Back to Life". On 19 October 2019, "Lying Down" was added under the A-list on BBC Radio 2 airplay playlist in the United Kingdom and became record of the week.

Critical reception
The song received positive critical reviews. According to A Bit of Pop Music, "Lying Down" is a modern pop ballad, in which Sia's style suits Dion's vocals and makes her sound contemporary. In this "powerful tune", the build up is "bombastic" and the vocals are "larger than life". Mike Wass from Idolator described "Lying Down" as a soaring electro-ballad, about jettisoning the baggage that comes along with a toxic relationship. He called the production "icy", which suggests that Dion is going to push the sonic boundaries on Courage.

Commercial performance
Despite not being an official single in the United States, it reached number 4 on Billboard's LyricFind Global Chart, becoming Dion's first top ten entry on the chart. After being released as a digital download on 18 September 2019, "Lying Down" debuted on several sales charts and reached number three in Quebec, number 32 in Canada, number 42 in France, number 59 in Scotland and number 74 in the United Kingdom. It also reached number 16 on the Finnish Airplay chart and number 18 on the Japanese Hot Overseas chart.

Music video
The audio of "Lying Down" was uploaded on YouTube on 18 September 2019. In an interview, which aired on Entertainment Tonight Canada in September 2019, Dion revealed that they are currently on the set of her music video for "Lying Down". However, the video was not released.

Credits and personnel

David Guetta – composer, lyricist, producer, programmer
Sia Furler – composer, lyricist, background vocal
Giorgio Tuinfort – composer, lyricist, producer, programmer, piano
Pierre-Luc Rioux – guitar
Ton Dijkman – drums
Marcel Schimscheimer – bass
Franck Van der Heijden - orchestrator
François Lalonde – recording engineer
Paul Norris – recording engineer
Paul Power – recording engineer
Rob Katz – assistant engineer
Wessel Oltheten – assistant engineer
Xavier Stephenson – assistant engineer
Ronald Prent – mixing engineer
Tibor Laho – mixing engineer

Source:

Charts

Release history

References

External links

2010s ballads
2019 songs
2019 singles
Celine Dion songs
Columbia Records singles
Pop ballads
Songs written by David Guetta
Songs written by Giorgio Tuinfort
Songs written by Sia (musician)